Laurence John Tully (30 July 1917 – 27 June 1981) was an Australian politician and a member of the New South Wales Legislative Assembly from 1946 until 1965. He was a member of the Labor Party (ALP) .

Tully was born in Sydney and was the son of Jack Tully the member for Goulburn in the Legislative Assembly between 1925 and 1946. He was educated at St Patrick's College, Goulburn and the Law Faculty of the University of Sydney. He was called to the bar in 1942. During World War Two, he served with the Royal Australian Air Force. After an unsuccessful campaign in the seat of Temora in 1944, Tully was elected to the parliament as the Labor member for Goulburn at the 1946 by-election caused by the resignation of his father. Tully retained the seat for the Labor Party at the next 6 elections and retired from public life at the 1965 election. He later became a company director.  He was briefly the Acting Chairman of Committees but did not hold any other party, parliamentary or ministerial office.

References

1917 births
1981 deaths
Members of the New South Wales Legislative Assembly
Australian Labor Party members of the Parliament of New South Wales
20th-century Australian politicians
Royal Australian Air Force personnel of World War II